Richard 'Frank' Trott (14 March 1915, in Cardiff – 28 January 1987) was a Welsh rugby union footballer of the 1930s and 1940s who played 205 rugby union (RU) games for Cardiff RFC, and represented Wales. He played Fullback and won 8 caps. his first against England v Wales at Twickenham, 17 Jan 1948 and his last against France v Wales at Colombes, 26 March 1949.

When his playing days were over Trott became Honorary Secretary to Cardiff RFC for many years.

Genealogical information

Frank Trott was Cousin to Cardiff RFC and Great Britain Prop Frank Whitcombe.

External links

1915 births
1987 deaths
Cardiff RFC players
Rugby union players from Cardiff
Wales international rugby union players
Barbarian F.C. players
Penarth RFC players